Shared-cost service is an intermediate level of telephone call billing where the charge for calling a particular international or long-distance phone number is partially, but not entirely, paid for by the recipient.

Domestic
Shared cost numbers normally enable non-geographical or long-distance calls that are priced to the caller as if they were local. The difference is paid by the called party.

International
International shared-cost service is known as ISCS or UISCN (Universal International Shared Cost Number). The service has been allocated country code +808. As of 2013, the numbers are only available to Germany, Liechtenstein and Switzerland.

An ISCS number would allow the calling individual to make a call which terminates in another country, but pay only the maximum rate for calls within their country (the national rate, which is not defined in all countries). The portion of the total call charges in excess of the caller's national rate are billed to the recipient.

External links
ITU ISCS page

Telephone numbers